Igor Koić (Serbian : Игор Коић, born 9 July 1990 in Kruševac, Serbia) is a Serbian-Greek footballer currently playing for AEL 1964.

References

External links
e-AEL Official
athleticlarissa
Aelole

Living people
1990 births
Serbian footballers
Association football midfielders
Serbian expatriate sportspeople in Greece
Pierikos F.C. players